Ivanon Angelino Coffie (born 16 May 1977 in Curaçao, Netherlands Antilles) is a Dutch baseball player.

He made his major league debut in 2000 with the Baltimore Orioles.  He appeared in 23 games.

Coffie represented the Netherlands at the 2004 Summer Olympics in Athens where he and his team finished in sixth place.

In 2008, Coffie signed with the Lancaster Barnstormers of the Atlantic League of Professional Baseball.

Sources

External links

Pelota Binaria (Venezuelan Winter League)

1977 births
Living people
Almere'90 players
Baltimore Orioles players
Baseball players at the 2004 Summer Olympics
Bowie Baysox players
Delmarva Shorebirds players
DOOR Neptunus players
Curaçao expatriate baseball players in Italy
Curaçao expatriate baseball players in the United States
Dutch people of Curaçao descent
Fargo-Moorhead RedHawks players
Frederick Keys players
Grosseto Baseball Club players
Gulf Coast Orioles players
Iowa Cubs players
Lancaster Barnstormers players
Major League Baseball players from Curaçao
Memphis Redbirds players
Navegantes del Magallanes players
Curaçao expatriate baseball players in Venezuela
Olympic baseball players of the Netherlands
Dutch baseball players
People from Willemstad
Rochester Red Wings players
Round Rock Express players
Rimini Baseball Club players
Curaçao expatriate baseball players in Taiwan
Dmedia T-REX players
Macoto Cobras players